Kidco is a 1984 American comedy film directed by Ronald F. Maxwell and starring Scott Schwartz, Clifton James, Charles Hallahan, Maggie Blye, and Vincent Schiavelli.

Although the premise sounds far-fetched, the film was based on the 1979 purchase of the public land in Gorda, California by Kidco Limited Ventures, a corporation owned by four children, all minors from Ramona, California, who were heirs of the family that owned the Cessna Aircraft company.  After funding the company, $500,000 was invested as a tax shelter to purchase the town's land.  At the time, Dickie Cessna was 14 years old and the other three siblings were June (16), Bette (13) and Nene (11).  After the Cessna children were paid for the filming rights, a dramatized version of the events was made and distributed by 20th Century.

Plot
An enterprising middle school boy named Dickie Cessna (Scott Schwartz), who lives at a country club where his father works decides to make some extra money by selling composted horse manure as fertilizer, and has his three sisters, Nene, June and Bette (two of whom are older) join him in the enterprise. As their sales increase, they draw increased scrutiny from the state tax board, as well as the large scale competitor who seeks to put them out of business at any cost.

The children eventually fight a court case brought against them by tax collectors from the State of California. They are able to prove that the fertilizer is not taxable as tax had already been paid on the horse feed before the horses processed it into manure, removing one of the counts brought upon them.  They eventually pleaded guilty to the others, which allows them to stay in business, to the consternation of the adult competitor.

Cast

Production
The film was shot on location in Tucson, Arizona.

References

External links
 
 
 

Films directed by Ronald F. Maxwell
1984 comedy films
1984 films
20th Century Fox films
Films scored by Michael Small
Films shot in Tucson, Arizona
1980s English-language films